Wounds is the third full-length release by American blackened death metal band The Funeral Pyre. It was released on May 27, 2008.

Unlike their earlier works, this album features no keyboards, instead replacing long time keyboard player, Daniella Jones, with guitarist Justin Garcia. According to the band's official web page, "We did 2 records with keyboards. We loved doing those records with keyboards. Things eventually started to not work out between both parties." However, near the end of their first tour of this album, Garcia, too, left the band, and was replaced by Lanny Perelman, formally a member of Cerberus.

The musical qualities are different from their first two albums. Many of the death metal elements were removed from this album and has been considered a loss for the band. However, the band's work on Wounds was praised for the songwriting and musicianship value of the album.

Guest vocals on the title track, "Wounds", were provided by Makh Daniels of the band Early Graves.

Track listing

Personnel  
 James Joyce - guitar
 Justin Garcia - guitar
 Alex Hernandez - drums
 John Strachan - vocals
 Adam Campbell - bass guitar

References 

2008 albums
The Funeral Pyre albums
Prosthetic Records albums